The IPSC Norwegian Rifle Championship is an IPSC level 3 championship held once a year by Dynamic Sports Shooting Norway.

Champions 
The following is a list of current and previous champions.

Overall category

Lady category

Junior category

Senior category

Super Senior category

See also 
 Nordic Rifle Championship
 Norwegian Handgun Championship
 Norwegian Tournament Championship

References 
 DSSN Hall of Fame
 TriggerFreeze.com - IPSC Rifle Norway
Match Results  - 2004 IPSC Norwegian Rifle Championship
Match Results  - 2005 IPSC Norwegian Rifle Championship
Match Results  - 2006 IPSC Norwegian Rifle Championship
Match Results  - 2009 IPSC Norwegian Rifle Championship
Match Results  - 2010 IPSC Norwegian Rifle Championship
Match Results  - 2011 IPSC Norwegian Rifle Championship
Match Results  - 2012 IPSC Norwegian Rifle Championship
Match Results  - 2016 IPSC Norwegian Rifle Championship

IPSC shooting competitions
National championships in Norway
Norway sport-related lists
Shooting competitions in Norway
National shooting championships